Brush High School is a public high school in Brush, Colorado, United States. It is the only high school in the Brush School District RE-2J.

References

External links

Public high schools in Colorado